Morten Wiegandt Sørensen or Morten Trap Sørensen also simply known as Morten W. Sørensen (born 1 May 1979) is a Danish male professional squash player. He reached his highest career singles ranking of 91 in June 2005.

References 

1979 births
Living people
Danish male squash players
Sportspeople from Copenhagen